Roberto James Bailey Sargent (10 August 1952 – 11 June 2019) was a Honduran football forward who played for Honduras in the 1982 FIFA World Cup.

Club career
Nicknamed El Robot, Bailey played for C.D. Marathón for whom he scored 47 goals. He and his brother Jimmy James Bailey share a record with the Palacios brothers, the sole families to have scored in more than one League final.

Career statistics

Club

Personal life
Bailey lived in San Pedro Sula and worked for a spare-parts agency.
He died in a car accident on June 11, 2019.

References

External links
FIFA profile

1952 births
2019 deaths
Association football forwards
Honduran footballers
Honduras international footballers
1982 FIFA World Cup players
C.D. Marathón players
Liga Nacional de Fútbol Profesional de Honduras players